K Desktop Environment 1 was the inaugural series of releases of the K Desktop Environment. There were two major releases in this series.

Pre-release 

The development started right after Matthias Ettrich's announcement on 1996-10-14 to found the Kool Desktop Environment. The word Kool was dropped shortly afterward and the name became simply K Desktop Environment.

In the beginning, all components were released to the developer community separately without any coordinated timeframe throughout the overall project. First communication of KDE via mailing list, that was called kde@fiwi02.wiwi.uni-Tubingen.de.

The first coordinated release was Beta 1 on  – almost exactly one year after the original announcement.

K Desktop Environment 1.0 

On 12 July 1998 the finished version 1.0 of K Desktop Environments was released:

This version received mixed reception. Many criticized the use of the Qt software framework – back then under the Qt Free Edition License which was claimed to not be compatible with free software – and advised the use of Motif or LessTif instead. Despite that criticism, KDE was well received by many users and made its way into the first Linux distributions.

K Desktop Environment 1.1 

An update, K Desktop Environment 1.1, was faster, more stable and included many small improvements. It also included a new set of icons, backgrounds and textures. Among this overhauled artwork was a new KDE logo by Torsten Rahn consisting of the letter K in front of a gear which is used in revised form to this day.

Some components received more far-reaching updates, such as the Konqueror predecessor kfm, the application launcher kpanel, and the KWin predecessor kwm. Newly introduced were e. g. kab, a software library for address management, and a rewrite of KMail, called kmail2, which was installed as alpha version in parallel to the classic KMail version. kmail2, however, never left alpha state and development was ended in favor of updating classic KMail.

K Desktop Environment 1.1 was well received among critics.

At the same time Trolltech prepared version 2.0 of Qt which was released as beta on 1999-01-28. Consequently, no bigger upgrades for KDE 1 based on Qt 1 were developed. Instead only bugfixes were released: version 1.1.1 on 1999-05-03 and version 1.1.2 on 1999-09-13.

A more profound upgrade along with a port to Qt 2 was in development as K Desktop Environment 2.

KDE Restoration Project 
To celebrate KDE's 20th birthday, KDE and Fedora contributor Helio Chissini de Castro re-released 1.1.2 on 2016-10-14.

That re-release incorporates several changes required for compatibility with modern Linux variants. Work on that project started one month earlier at QtCon, a conference for Qt developers, in Berlin. There Castro showcased Qt 1.45 compiling on a modern Linux system.

See also 
Linux on the desktop

References 

1998 software
Desktop environments
KDE Software Compilation

de:K Desktop Environment#K Desktop Environment 1.x